St Mary’s Cambridge Higher Secondary School, also Saint Mary’s Cambridge Higher Secondary School and formerly St Mary's Cambridge High School, is a private Catholic primary and secondary school for boys, located on Murree Road in Rawalpindi, Pakistan.

History 
St Mary’s Cambridge Higher Secondary School is one of the oldest independent schools of Rawalpindi. It is housed in an old building which was previously used as hospital, named Holy Family Hospital. The hospital moved to its present building in Satellite Town during the early 1950s and the building was handed over to the school. The school is owned and managed by the Roman Catholic Diocese of Islamabad-Rawalpindi. It provides religious education in Islam as per the curriculum decided by the local education board.

Location and facilities 
St Mary’s Cambridge Higher Secondary School is located on Murree Road between Liaqat Bagh and Committee Chowk. It is easily accessible from anywhere in the city and from Islamabad.

Houses
The names of the houses are: Thysen (yellow), Iqbal (green), Jinnah (blue), Liaquat (red).

Events
On May 10, 2008, the school was the venue for a Run for Unity program. It involved students aged 11–15 in drawing, essay-writing, poetry, song, PowerPoint and video-making competitions. Archbishop Adolfo Tito Yllana, the apostolic nuncio to Pakistan, and Bishop Anthony Lobo attended.

Notable alumni

 Rashid Minhas NHpilot in the Pakistan Air Force

References

External links
 Official website

Boys' schools in Pakistan
Schools in Rawalpindi
Catholic elementary and primary schools in Pakistan
Catholic secondary schools in Pakistan
1949 establishments in Pakistan
Educational institutions established in 1949